Augustine "Gussie" Ryan (born 1966) is an Irish retired hurler who played as a left wing-forward for the Limerick senior team.

An All-Ireland-winning captain in the under-21 grade, Ryan made his first appearance for the senior team during the 1987-88 National League and became a regular member of the team over the next few seasons. During that time he failed to claim any honours at senior level.

At club level Ryan is a one-time county club championship medalist with Claughaun.

References

1966 births
Living people
Claughaun hurlers
Limerick inter-county hurlers